WICH (1310 AM, "Personality Radio") is a radio station licensed to serve Norwich, Connecticut.  The station is owned by Bonnie Rowbotham and licensed to Hall Communications, Inc.  It airs a talk and nostalgia format.

The station was assigned the WICH call letters by the U.S. Federal Communications Commission.

John Deme was the founder and original owner of WNOC 1400 AM, which went on the air from Norwich with 250 watts in September 1946. It changed its call sign to WICH on May 27, 1949, moved to 1310 kHz with 1,000 watts in 1955, and upgraded to 5,000 watts in 1961.

In its long 70-year history, the Norwich Cuprak Road station was noted for its on-air personalities (even its station tagline eventually became "personality radio"):
 
Stu Bryer, (longtime midday host and station favorite) 
Johnny London, former Morning drive-time personality, (who both ran for city mayor and once boxed at a local celebrity function), 
Jim Reed (station manager and son of first super salesman Dick Reed), 
Bill Reese (legendary comedic late night host), 
Dick Legare (whose Saturday afternoon show, "Beachcomber's Beat" was a town favorite), 
Michael Bernz, 
newscaster Cassidy Driscoll,
newscaster Kevin Gorden.
The station hosted such programs as "Swap Shop" and "Stu-same Street".

References

External links
WICH official website

ICH
Nostalgia radio in the United States
Talk radio stations in the United States
Radio stations established in 1946
1946 establishments in Connecticut